Popovka is a rural locality (a village) in Piksimovskoye Rural Settlement, Vashkinsky District, Vologda Oblast, Russia. The population was 30 as of 2002.

Geography 
The distance to Lipin Bor is 48 km, to Piksimovo is 8 km. Yekimovo is the nearest rural locality.

References 

Rural localities in Vashkinsky District